Viva Buddy is a 1934 Warner Bros. Looney Tunes cartoon directed by Jack King. The short was released on December 12, 1934, and stars Buddy, the second star of the series.

Summary
The film opens to Buddy, who, ambling through a Mexican town, strums a guitar and sings "Monterey" (to the tune of "Madrid"). He walks off of a balcony and falls on the myriad hats worn by a hat salesman, trapping him therein. A swift kick in the pants from Buddy, and the salesman is on his way. Buddy attempts to enter the sleepy Cantina El Moocher, but is physically rebuffed by the enormity of snores within, and compelled instead to enter through an open window. Everywhere men sleep, even at a checkers table, where jumping beans play for them. Buddy slips one of the lively beans into the mouth of a man at the bar's piano, and he begins to play with his toes. The people are roused by this, and begin happily dancing and drinking; a makeshift mariachi band plays in tune. Buddy is apparently able to play his guitar with his teeth; his guitar can also play itself; Buddy also can play while his feet hang in the air.

Enter the outlaw Pancho, (a dead ringer for "Viva Villa" star Wallace Beery) who does some fancy gunwork to frighten the townsfolk.  After tying his horse's tail to a hole in a stake (licking the hair in place much like threading a needle), the villain steps into the saloon and starts firing. The patrons (except Buddy) scatter and shout "Pancho!" "Pancho!" "Pancho!" Then, appearing from an unfolding Murphy bed, the four Marx brothers shout: "Zeppo!" "Harpo!" "Chico!" "Groucho!".

But Pancho makes a mistake in shooting and destroying Buddy's banana. Our indignant hero boldly squeezes the remainder of the fruit in his adversary's face. Pancho puts one of his guns to Buddy's head, but declares that he likes the little fellow, and commands him to play the piano (into which he has been backed.) Cookie, heretofore absent, begins to dance to Buddy's tune, "Famabella". Pancho proves himself a dancer as well, to the anger of an upstaged Cookie, and requests a kiss from her. Of course, the scoundrel winds up with his backside through the canteen door, and back again into the canteen by the fury of a cranky goat.

Pancho again makes an advance on Cookie, and an annoyed Buddy fires a serving fork at Pancho's behind by means of a cello. "I kill you to little pieces!" shouts Pancho. But both of the dastard's pistols are blocked by a two-pronged candelabra thrown, with marvellous accuracy, by Buddy. Pancho shows his whip, and with it snags Buddy from across the room; Buddy punches his captor in vain. Eventually, Our Hero grabs a ceiling fixture that spins both competitors round and round, flinging them finally into an easily  breaking counter. The cartoon concludes on a friendly note; in the fashion of Beery's character Butch from The Big House (1930 film) Pancho takes Buddy by the shoulder and announces that he was "only fooling." The competitors heartily laugh together.

Cookie's appearance
In those Buddy shorts supervised by Jack King, Cookie generally has blond, braided hair; it is odd, then, that this cartoon should feature Buddy's sweetheart with her more traditional black hair.

The Marx Brothers
This marks the only appearance of the Marx Brothers in a Buddy cartoon: notably, it features Zeppo, who by this time had already played a part in his final film with his brothers, Duck Soup.

Dating discrepancy
Sources differ on the release date of this short and of the order of its release. This article follows the chronology given in the article Looney Tunes and Merrie Melodies filmography (1929-1939). For more on this issue, see the relevant section of the article Buddy's Circus.

References

External links
 
 

1934 films
1934 animated films
1930s American animated films
1930s animated short films
American black-and-white films
Cultural depictions of the Marx Brothers
Films scored by Norman Spencer (composer)
Films directed by Jack King
Buddy (Looney Tunes) films
Films set in Mexico
Looney Tunes shorts